Nitipong Saiyasit (Thai นิติพงษ์ ไสยสิทธิ์ ) is a Thai footballer. He plays for Thailand Premier League clubside Samut Songkhram FC.

External links
Profile at Thaipremierleague.co.th

1980 births
Living people
Nitipong Saiyasit
Association football defenders
Nitipong Saiyasit